The Max Planck Institute for Biological Cybernetics is located in Tübingen, Baden-Württemberg, Germany. It is one of 80 institutes in the Max Planck Society (Max Planck Gesellschaft).

The institute is studying signal and information processing in the brain. We know that our brain is constantly processing a vast amount of sensory and intrinsic information by which our behavior is coordinated accordingly. How the brain actually achieves these tasks is less well understood, for example, how it perceives, recognizes, and learns new objects. The scientists at the Max Planck Institute for Biological Cybernetics aim to determine which signals and processes are responsible for creating a coherent percept of our environment and for eliciting the appropriate behavior. Scientists of three departments and seven research groups are working towards answering fundamental questions about processing in the brain, using different approaches and methods.

Departments 

Department for Sensory and Sensorimotor Systems (Zhaoping Li)
Department for High-field Magnetic Resonance (Klaus Scheffler)
Department for Computational Neuroscience (Peter Dayan)

Research groups 

Dynamic Cognition Group (Assaf Breska)
Translational Sensory and Circadian Neuroscience (Manuel Spitschan)
Computational Principles of Intelligence (Eric Schulz)
 Systems Neuroscience & Neuroengineering (Jennifer Li & Drew Robson)

Former departments 

Department for Physiology of Cognitive Processes (Nikos Logothetis)
Department for Human Perception, Cognition and Action (Heinrich H. Bülthoff)
 Empirical Inference (Bernhard Schölkopf)
 Information Processing in Insects (Werner E. Reichardt)
 Structure & Function of Natural Nerve-Net (Valentin von Braitenberg)

External links 
 Homepage of the Max Planck Institute for Biological Cybernetics

Biological Cybernetics
Biological research institutes
Systems science institutes
Organisations based in Tübingen
Education in Tübingen
Cybernetics